XRM may refer to:

 International Conference on X-Ray Microscopy, a biennial physics conference
 X-ray microscope, a high-resolution imaging system using X-rays
 xRM, an evolution of the concept Customer Relationship Management (CRM)